Hideto Nakane (born 2 May 1990 in Nagoya) is a Japanese professional road racing cyclist, who competed as a professional from 2012 to 2022.

Major results

2013
 6th Overall Tour de Hokkaido
2014
 4th Overall Tour de Kumano
 4th Overall Tour de Ijen
 9th Overall Tour de East Java
2015
 4th Overall Tour de Kumano
1st Mountains classification
2016
 4th Overall Tour de Hokkaido
2017
 8th Overall Tour d'Azerbaïdjan
 9th Overall Tour de Hokkaido
2018
 5th Road race, Asian Games
 8th Overall Tour de Taiwan
 9th Overall Tour of Japan
2019
 6th Japan Cup
2020
 6th Overall Tour de Langkawi
1st Stage 6
 7th Overall Tour de Taiwan
2021
 National Road Championships
3rd Time trial
3rd Road race

References

External links

1990 births
Living people
Japanese male cyclists
Cyclists at the 2018 Asian Games
Asian Games competitors for Japan
Sportspeople from Nagoya